Dibyendu Chakrabarty (born 15 November 1982) is an Indian former cricketer. He played ten first-class matches for Bengal between 2008 and 2010.

See also
 List of Bengal cricketers

References

External links
 

1982 births
Living people
Indian cricketers
Bengal cricketers
People from Howrah